Archibald Balfour (16 July 1840 – 29 October 1922) was an English first-class cricketer.

The son of Charles Balfour, he was born at Marylebone in July 1840. He was educated at Westminster School, leaving in 1859 and being appointed a clerk in The Admiralty. Balfour later played first-class cricket for the Marylebone Cricket Club against Sussex at Lord's in 1862. He also made two first-class appearances for the Gentlemen of the Marylebone Cricket Club against the Gentlemen of Kent in the Canterbury Cricket Week's of 1862 and 1863. Balfour struggled in his three first-class matches, scoring 16 runs in these matches, with a highest score 5. Balfour later left the admiralty and became a merchant, like his father. He was a merchant in the Russian Empire at Saint Petersburg, where he was resident for many years. Balfour later returned to England, where he died at Chelsea in October 1922. His daughter was Edith Lyttelton, the novelist, playwright, World War I-era activist and spiritualist, who was born in Saint Petersburg in 1865. His brothers were Edward  and Robert, who were both first-class cricketers.

References

External links

1840 births
1922 deaths
People from Marylebone
People educated at Westminster School, London
English civil servants
English cricketers
Marylebone Cricket Club cricketers
Gentlemen of Marylebone Cricket Club cricketers
English merchants
Archibald